Dave is a 1993 American political comedy film directed by Ivan Reitman, written by Gary Ross, and starring Kevin Kline and Sigourney Weaver. Frank Langella, Kevin Dunn, Laura Linney, Ving Rhames, Charles Grodin, and Ben Kingsley appear in supporting roles.

Plot
Dave Kovic runs a temporary employment agency in Georgetown, Washington, D.C.,  and impersonates President Bill Mitchell as a side job. Secret Service agent Duane Stevenson recruits him to impersonate Mitchell after a speech, ostensibly as a security precaution, but in reality to cover up Mitchell’s affair with a staffer. Dave’s appearance goes well, but Mitchell suffers a major stroke while having sex, leading White House Chief of Staff Bob Alexander and Communications Director Alan Reed to ask Dave to continue in his role. Bob’s scheme is to force Vice President Gary Nance, a good man, to resign after purposefully embroiling him in a savings and loan scandal, and then have Dave, acting as Mitchell, appoint Bob as vice president, whereupon they will reveal Mitchell’s incapacity and Bob will become president. Alan is initially reluctant to agree to the plan, but eventually acquiesces and tells the press corps the stroke was minor. Dave agrees to keep impersonating Mitchell and Nance is sent on a good will tour of Africa.

Dave's charm and enthusiasm for life changes Mitchell’s previously grumpy image and increases his popularity. First Lady Ellen Mitchell, who has been privately estranged from her husband for years, is initially convinced that Dave is her husband and treats him with contempt on the few occasions they see each other. When Dave accompanies her to a homeless shelter, for which she is a staunch advocate, she sees his empathy towards a shy boy and begins to soften towards him. Her fury returns, though, after Bob forges Mitchell’s signature on the veto of a public works bill that included funding for the shelter. Dave, after consulting his accountant friend Murray Blum, works with the Cabinet to restore the funding. A furious Bob threatens to destroy Dave, but Alan vows to expose their scheme if he does.

Ellen, having witnessed Dave's considerable efforts to save the shelter, confronts Dave and he admits he is an impostor. Dave has Duane escort them to the secret hospital room beneath the White House, where Mitchell remains in a coma. They both resolve to leave the White House, but become closer after spending a night out alone together. Ellen tells Dave she's gone along with the charade of being happily married to Bill because she thought she could help people as First Lady. Dave tells her he wishes he could do the same. They begin to fall in love and choose to stay.

The next day, Dave calls a press conference and, when Bob fires him, threatens to tell the press corps the truth about Mitchell. He orders Bob to resign and announces a plan to provide a job to every American who wants one.

Nance returns from Africa and pleads his innocence of the scandal to Dave, who hears about Bob’s plot from Alan. To get back at Dave, Bob reveals evidence implicating Mitchell in the scandal, which Alan admits is true. Despite talk of impeachment, Dave refuses to back off his jobs plan.

During a joint session of Congress, Dave admits that Bob’s allegations are true and takes responsibility for the scandal. He produces proof, furnished by Alan, that shows Bob was directly involved and Nance is innocent. As he continues his speech, he fakes another stroke and switches bodies with Mitchell on the way to the hospital, enabling him to resume his previous life. The hospital pronounces the "second" stroke as major and Mitchell continues to lie in a coma for several more months before dying. Nance becomes president, Bob and several administration officials are eventually indicted, and the jobs plan becomes law.

Dave runs for city council with the help of Murray and his staff at his employment agency. Dave is surprised one day when Ellen visits. He escorts her into his office where they share their first kiss. Dave closes the shades to give them privacy and Duane steps in front of the door, wearing one of Dave’s campaign buttons.

Cast

Cameos
Politicians

Media personalities

Senators Al D'Amato, Lloyd Bentsen, and Daniel Patrick Moynihan were scheduled to make cameo appearances in the film but withdrew in protest of Warner Records's decision to release Body Count's song "Cop Killer." NBC also prohibited Andrea Mitchell from making a planned appearance in the film.

Production
Producer Lauren Shuler Donner and screenwriter Gary Ross had known each other since taking a Stella Adler class in the 1970s, and in 1988 Ross told Shuler Donner his idea for Dave. Ross wrote the script while working on the Michael Dukakis presidential campaign during the 1988 election, and he was inspired by the Iran-contra affair. Ross also received advice from First Lady Barbara Bush's press secretary Anna Perez. Shuler-Donner approved it, but her employer Walt Disney Productions refused to release it while a conservative such as Ronald Reagan or George H. W. Bush held the presidency. Warner Bros. bought the project with the intent to have it directed by Shuler-Donner's husband Richard Donner, but he decided against continuing with the project in 1990.  Production was delayed by three years to wait for Shuler Donner to be released from her contract with Disney and for director Ivan Reitman to become available.

According to Reitman, Warner Bros. wanted a box office star to portray the lead role and that one executive even suggested Arnold Schwarzenegger to play the part.  Michael Keaton was briefly cast in the role but had to drop out. Both Warren Beatty and Kevin Costner were also considered for the role. In fact, it was Beatty who brought Dave to Reitman's attention.  Kevin Kline almost turned down the role because he thought he would be playing the same character he played in A Fish Called Wanda.

Nevertheless, Kline was hired to play the protagonist, as Reitman considered him to have a presidential look and be an actor "who was both dramatically strong and was light on his feet," as Kline would not only be playing a double role but the film was a comedy that dealt with very serious subject matter. Reitman then called Sigourney Weaver, with whom he had worked in Ghostbusters, for the First Lady role. Ross was present for production, as he was interested in starting a directing career as well.

Filming began on August 13, 1992, in Los Angeles and Washington D.C. White House interior sets were filmed at Warner Bros. Studios, Burbank while exterior scenes were filmed at the Los Angeles Arboretum in Arcadia, California. The film's Oval Office set was constructed based on a replica at the Ronald Reagan Presidential Library and would be reused more than 25 times, for television shows and films like The Pelican Brief, In the Line of Fire, Hot Shots! Part Deux and Absolute Power.

Reception

Box office

Dave debuted at number 2 at the US box office, behind Dragon: The Bruce Lee Story. It later jumped to number 1 in its second weekend. In total, Dave made $63.3 million in the United States and Canada and $28.5 million internationally for a worldwide total of $91.8 million.

Critical response

Dave was met with critical acclaim and has a 95% rating based on 55 reviews collected at Rotten Tomatoes. The consensus on the site states: "Ivan Reitman's refreshingly earnest political comedy benefits from an understated, charming script and a breezy performance by Kevin Kline."

Roger Ebert of the Chicago Sun-Times gave the film three and a half stars out of four. Ebert praised the film's acting and wrote, "Dave takes that old plot about an ordinary person who is suddenly thrust into a position of power, and finds a fresh way to tell it. [...] When I first heard this story line, I imagined that Dave would be completely predictable. I was wrong. The movie is more proof that it isn't what you do, it's how you do it: Ivan Reitman's direction and Gary Ross's screenplay use intelligence and warmhearted sentiment to make Dave into wonderful lighthearted entertainment. [...] Both Kline and Weaver are good at playing characters of considerable intelligence, and that's the case here. The movie may be built on subtle variations of the Idiot Plot (in which the characters skillfully avoid tripping over obvious conclusions), but they bring such particular qualities to their characters that we almost believe them."

Then-President Bill Clinton approved of the film, and gave Ross a framed script, which Clinton had autographed, writing that it was a "funny, often accurate lampooning of politics." Clinton also gave Ross a picture of himself holding a Dave mug.

Accolades

Year-end lists
American Film Institute recognition:
 AFI's 100 Years... 100 Laughs – Nominated

Other media

Musical
A musical based on the movie opened at the Arena Stage in Washington, D.C., in July 2018. The book is written by Thomas Meehan and Nell Benjamin, with music by Tom Kitt. The production is directed by Tina Landau and stars Drew Gehling as Dave and Douglas Sills as Chief of Staff Bob Alexander.

See also
 List of American films of 1993
 The Magnificent Fraud
 Moon over Parador
 Mr. Smith Goes to Washington
 Double Star

References

External links

 

1990s political comedy films
1993 comedy films
1993 films
American political comedy films
American political satire films
1990s English-language films
Films about fictional presidents of the United States
Films directed by Ivan Reitman
Films produced by Lauren Shuler Donner
Films scored by James Newton Howard
Films set in the White House
Films set in Washington, D.C.
Films with screenplays by Gary Ross
Films produced by Ivan Reitman
Films about lookalikes
United States presidential succession in fiction
Warner Bros. films
Films shot in Washington, D.C.
Films shot in Los Angeles
Films shot in Los Angeles County, California
1990s American films